Natalie Dunn is a singer, songwriter, and artist from Queensland, Australia. Primarily a songwriter, she has gained notoriety for writing for artists like Marshmello, Anne-Marie, Kygo, Rita Ora, Hayden James, Duke Dumont, and Charli XCX, among others. She had a major success with the song "FRIENDS" performed by Anne-Marie & Marshmello, which peaked at Number 11 on the Billboard Top 100 in the summer of 2018 and surpassed 1 Billion views on YouTube. Dunn also worked on "Carry On" (performed by Rita Ora and Kygo) for the 2019 film Detective Pikachu. The song peaked at number three on on the ARIA Dance Singles chart in May 2019.

In June 2019, Dunn was honored by APRA AMCOS for her contribution to "FRIENDS" after amassing more than one billion streams. Dunn was the first to be added to the society’s new club, which recognizes Australian songwriters for their contribution to streaming hits.

In 2022 Nat Dunn co-wrote 'TALLY' on Blackpink's highly anticipated sophomore album Born Pink which debuted at #1 in the U.S and U.K. 

Dunn is also a part of the duo Naations, with Nicky Night Time who released the U.K. radio single 'Real Life' with Duke Dumont. Nat Dunn is also signed to EMI Records for her own solo project.

In 2020, Dunn opened her own company, Mutual Muse Group, as creative space to help curate and advise on other artist projects which include artist like JoJo, Paloma Faith and exceptional development acts.

Discography

Extended plays

Singles

As lead artist

As featured artist

Other appearances

Awards and nominations

AIR Awards
The Australian Independent Record Awards (commonly known informally as AIR Awards) is an annual awards night to recognise, promote and celebrate the success of Australia's Independent Music sector.

|-
| AIR Awards of 2015
| "Gonna Get Better" (with Nicky Night Time)
| Best Independent Dance/Electronic Club Song or EP
| 
|-

Queensland Music Awards
The Queensland Music Awards (previously known as Q Song Awards) are annual awards celebrating Queensland, Australia's brightest emerging artists and established legends. They commenced in 2006.
 
! 
|-
| 2020
| herself
| Export Achievement Award
| 
| 
|-
! scope="row" rowspan="2"| 2022
| rowspan="2"| "Foolproof" (with Hayden James and Gorgon City)
| Electronic / Dance Award of the Year
| 
|rowspan="2"| 
|-
| Regional / Remote Award
| 
|}

Songwriting credits
John Course & Goodwill - "I Don't Think That You Know" (Electro Funk Lovers Remix) (2007)
Good Oak - "Provider" (2013)
Dami Im - "Heart So Dry" (2014)
Skylar Stecker - "Boomerang" (2015)
Chris Brown - "No Filter" (2015)
G.R.L. - "Are We Good" (2016)
Tkay Maidza - "Afterglow", "House of Cards", "State Of Mind"  (2016)
Tiesto - "No Worries" (2017)
R3HAB & Quintino – "I Just Can't" (2017)
The Potbelleez – "Show Me Where Your Love Is" (2017)
Jasmine Thompson – "Old Friends" (2017)
Charli XCX - "5 in the Morning" (2018) 
Marshmello, Anne-Marie - "Friends (Marshmello and Anne-Marie song)" (2018)
Kygo, Rita Ora - "Carry On (Kygo and Rita Ora song)" (2019)
Ella Henderson - "Glorious" (2019)
Anne-Marie - "Her" (2020)
Blackpink - "Tally" (2022)
Ive - "My Satisfaction" (2022)
Twice - "Gone" (2022)

References

Australian women singers
Living people
Year of birth missing (living people)